The 2012 UK Open Qualifier 8 was the last of eight 2012 UK Open Darts Qualifiers which was held at the NIA Community Hall in Birmingham on Sunday 6 May.

Prize money

Draw

References

8